De Lage Landen International B.V. (DLL) is a global vendor finance company with almost EUR 40 billion in assets. Founded in 1969 and headquartered in Eindhoven, The Netherlands, it provides asset-based financial solutions in the Agriculture, Food, Healthcare, Clean technology, Construction, Transportation, Industrial Equipment, Office Equipment and Technology industries.

DLL is a wholly owned subsidiary of Rabobank Group.

DLL is a credit institution under the Capital Requirements Regulation (CRR) and is a 100% subsidiary of the Coöperatieve Rabobank U.A. (Rabobank). DLL operates through local legal entities, which may conduct business using local licenses and under supervision of local regulators (e.g., DLL Finans AB in Sweden and Banco De Lage Landen Brasil S.A. in Brasil). For (part of) the business in Germany, Italy, Spain and Portugal, business is executed in branches of DLL where the passporting rights of DLL are leveraged. DLL holds 100% of the shares of its subsidiaries, except for “ joint ventures,” where DLL still controls the entities by having a majority in voting rights and economic interest.

In 2013, DLL was ranked in the top five of European Leasing Companies and, in 2014, ranked first in the Top 25 Vendor Finance companies in the U.S. Carlo van Kemenade is the Chief Executive Officer.

History
DLL was founded in 1969 as De Lage Landen by Rabobank and Interpolis as a credit company.

For 2014 DLL reported a 10% growth of its portfolio to reach 34.5 billion Euro (42 billion USD) and net profit of 454 million Euro (602 million USD). This is a 13% increase compared to 2013. In 2014, the company rebranded as DLL, along with a new logo.

EMEA (Europe, the Middle East and Africa) 
 Started in 1969;
 Operating in 20 countries (Austria, Belgium, Denmark, Finland, France, Germany, Hungary, Ireland, Italy, Luxembourg, Netherlands, Norway, Poland, Portugal, Russia, Spain, Sweden, Switzerland, Turkey, and the United Kingdom);
 46.2% of DLL’s leasing portfolio is generated in EMEA (2020);

Americas 
 Started in this region in 1998;
 Established in 8 countries (Argentina, Brazil, Canada, Chile, Colombia, Mexico, Peru and the United States of America);
 45.6% of DLL’s leasing portfolio is generated in the Americas (2020);

Asia Pacific 
 Started in this region in 2002;
 Established in 6 countries (Australia, China (including Hong Kong), India, Singapore, South Korea and New Zealand);
 8.2% of DLL’s leasing portfolio is generated in Asia Pacific (2020);

Key moments in the company’s history

References

Dutch brands
Financial services companies of the Netherlands